In aviation, a SAFO (Safety Alert for Operators) is an information tool that alerts, educates, and makes recommendations to the aviation community .

See also
 Aviation Safety Network

Aviation safety